Tom Farrage may refer to:
 Tom Farrage (footballer)
 Tom Farrage (designer)